Ansar al-Sharia in Tunisia ("Supporters of Islamic Law in Tunisia") is a radical Islamist group that operates in Tunisia. In 2013, the group was estimated to have roughly 10,000 members. It has been listed as a terrorist group by the Tunisian government as well  by Iraq, the United Nations, the UAE, the United Kingdom and the United States. Some of its members may be linked to the 2015 Sousse attacks. In 2013, the group declared loyalty to Al-Qaeda.

Background 
Following the Tunisian revolution, many Islamist political prisoners held by the regime of Zine El Abidine Ben Ali were released, including Seifallah Ben Hassine, who had previously co-founded the Tunisian Combat Group with Tarek Maaroufi in June 2000.

Abu Ayadh aka ben Hassine founded Ansar al-Sharia in late April 2011. The group quickly established a media branch, al-Qairawan Media Foundation, and developed different media outlets including a blog, Facebook page, and a magazine. Ansar al-Sharia held a national conference at Kairouan in 2012 in which Abu Ayadh aka ben Hassine called for the Islamization of Tunisia's media, education, tourism and commercial sectors, and the establishment of an Islamic trade union to confront the secular Tunisian General Labour Union. The group also campaigned for the release of Islamist prisoners, such as Omar Abdel-Rahman, Abu Qatada and Tunisians who had fought with al-Qaeda in Iraq and are held in Iraqi jails.

Members of Ansar al-Sharia have regularly taken part in protests in Tunisia against perceived blasphemy and have been suspected of involvement in a number of violent incidents. The Tunisian Interior ministry accused the group of masterminding the 2013 wave of political assassinations in Tunisia. Violent incidents attributed to members of the group include attacks on a television station that showed the movie Persepolis in October 2011, attacks on a controversial art exhibit in June 2012, a deadly attack in September 2012 on the US embassy in Tunisia and the assassination of politicians Chokri Belaid (February 2013) and Mohamed Brahmi (July 2013).

The group was designated as a terrorist organisation by the Tunisian government in August 2013. The group was damaged by the widespread arrests that followed this designation, and many of its members left Tunisia, traveling to Libya and joining the local Ansar al-Sharia, or going to Syria and joining the Islamic State of Iraq and the Levant.

An interview conducted over the course of three different meetings between January and March 2013 with a young leader of Ansar al-Sharia based in Tunis describes the intellectual basis for the Salafist movement:

Ben Hassine was reportedly killed in a US airstrike in Libya in June 2015. In March 2020, al-Qaeda in the Islamic Maghreb leader Abdelmalek Droukdel announced Ben Hassine's death but did not say when he died.

Criticism

In its weekly newspaper al-Naba, in an article eulogizing Shaykh Abu Layla Kamal Zarruq at-Tunisi al-Qurashi, a Tunisian leader in the Islamic State of Iraq and the Levant, the Islamic State severely criticised Ansar al-Sharia in Tunisia and its leader Abu Iyad, saying 
The Ansar ash-Shari’ah organization, which was at the forefront, suffered from several problems, the most important being the misguidance of its leader, Abu ‘Iyad, and his promotion of Ayman al-Zawahiri ideas regarding their intention to make Tunisia an ’ard da’wah" (land of invitation) and not an "ard jihad" (land of waging jihad), which reassured the taghut so-called "post-Arab revolutions governments" that they would not fight them, instead asking them to give them room to simply "invite". It also suffered from Abu ‘Iyad’s ideas that were restricted to the country, focused on limiting the work to Tunisia, and based on his desire to lead the global jihad, despite his lack of experience and his weakness, which in turn led his organization in to the abyss when the new taghut revealed to them its new face.

Thus, those connected to him experienced the worst of torture, many of them being leaders of the organization, and only a few people survived this holocaust to which they were led by Abu ‘Iyad and his foolishness, frailty, and preferring his own opinions and those of his shaykh Abu Qatada al-Filastini and his emir Ayman adh-Dhawahiri. Those few who survived were they whom Allah guided to hijrah and jihad for the cause of Allah by opposing Abu Ayadh, who refused that the youth should emerge onto the battlefields of jihad, and  specifically in Sham, wanting to keep them under his control, to use them in his failed projects and hand them over with  his foolishness, to the tawaghit.

Foreign relations

Designation as a terrorist organization
Countries and organizations below have officially listed the Ansar al-Sharia in Tunisia as a terrorist organization.

See also

 List of terrorist incidents in Tunisia

References

Further reading
 Daveed Gartenstein-Ross, Bridget Moreng & Kathleen Soucy, Raising the Stakes: Ansar Al-Sharia in Tunisia's Shift to Jihad (International Centre for Counter-Terrorism - The Hague, 2014)
 Daveed Gartenstein-Ross,  Ansar al-Sharia Tunisia's Long Game: Dawa, Hisba and Jihad (International Centre for Counter-Terrorism - The Hague, 2013)

Rebel groups in Tunisia
Organizations based in Africa designated as terrorist
Jihadist groups
Salafi Jihadist groups
Qutbist organisations
Islamism in Tunisia
Islamist groups
Organizations designated as terrorist by Iraq
Organisations designated as terrorist by the United Kingdom
Organizations designated as terrorist by the United States